GPR may refer to:

Science and technology
 Gaussian process regression, an interpolation method in statistics 
 General-purpose register of a microprocessor 
 G-protein coupled receptor
 Ground-penetrating radar
 Ground potential rise, in electrical engineering

Other
 General practice residency, in dentistry in the United States 
 Georgia Public Radio, in Georgia, United States
 Glider Pilot Regiment of the British Army 
 GPR index, a stock index of property companies 
 Grupa na rzecz Partii Robotniczej, the Polish section of the Committee for a Workers' International